Ultimate S'Express is a compilation album by English dance music act S'Express. Released in 1998, it comprises tracks from 1989's debut album Original Soundtrack and the US version of the 1991 follow-up album Intercourse.

Track listing
"Theme from S'Express" - 6:02
"Superfly Guy" - 3:31
"Hey Music Lover" - 4:30
"L'age du Gateau" - 5:02
"Can You Feel Me" - 4:34
"Blow Me Another Lollypop" - 3:54
"Coma II (A.M./O.K.)" - 4:56
"Pimps, Pushers & Prostitutes" - 5:56
"Nothing to Lose" - 6:45
"Find 'Em, Fool 'Em, Forget 'Em" - 4:48
"Mantra for a State of Mind" - 8:47
"Supersonic Lover" - 5:20
"Brazil" - 4:29

References

S'Express albums
1998 compilation albums